Urker (Úrker) is a Kazakh pop-folk group established in 1994. They have toured internationally in Germany, France, Turkey, Turkmenistan, and the United States.

Members 
The band consists of:
Aydos Saghat (Айдос Сағат): The vocalist, keyboardist, and songwriter for Urker, he studied in a conservatory in his youth, but initially dreamed of becoming a conductor rather than a songwriter.
Rustam Musin (Рустам Мусин): The guitarist for Urker, he has no formal musical education, and originally trained as an engineer.

History and development
Urker formed in 1994; lead vocalist and songwriter Aydos Saghat stated that he was inspired to form the group by the example of The Beatles. They recorded their first album in 1997; in 2001, their song "Nauryz" won the Golden Disk award, reflecting their rise to popularity. Their music combines traditional Kazakh folk melodies and modern pop rhythms. Of their fifteen music videos produced up until 2005, fourteen were filmed in Kazakhstan; only the remaining one, "Tugan Elim", was recorded abroad, in Tashkent, Uzbekistan. Their 2007 video "Arman", shot in cooperation with Tatar musician Rezeda Galimova, was also recorded in Hong Kong. Saghat has stated that their visuals and cinematographic technique are highly influenced by British musician Peter Gabriel. In April 2007, Urker travelled to New York City for a live performance at the Lincoln Center for the Performing Arts in celebration of the holiday of Nauryz; in an interview following his return to Kazakhstan, Saghat stated that Urker would be releasing a new album later in the year.

Discography 
 Ansarym, 1997
 Toi Bastar, 1998
 Urker, 2001
 Made in Kazakhstan, 2002
 The best of Urker, 2004
 Tolgau, 2008

References

Kazakhstani musical groups
Musical groups established in 1994